Fazilpur is a large village located in Nawabganj of Bareilly district, Uttar Pradesh.

References

Villages in Bareilly district